Music in the Rockies was a week-long festival held in Estes Park, Colorado, USA, which also featured a combination of seminars, competitions, concerts, and events related to Contemporary Christian Music, other kinds of Christian music, and the Christian music business industry. It has been replaced by a new event called Immerse.

History
The event started in 1975 as Seminar in the Rockies, launched by Christian Artists' Corp's president Cam Floria.

In 2000, the Gospel Music Association (GMA) began to take over the event. 

In 2004, they changed the event's name to GMA Music in the Rockies.

The event/festival was previously held at YMCA of the Rockies in Estes Park, Colorado.

Both "Music in the Rockies" and "Seminar in the Rockies" had a series of concerts in the evenings, with some notable performers and attendees. The 34th annual event was held from August 3 to August 9, 2008.

In 2009, the event was replaced by a new event called Immerse. 

Immerse is put on by the Gospel Music Association and LifeWay Christian Resources. 

Immerse features a series of seminars. It also has a competition section that is broken down into several categories, and an overall winner is determined. It is held in the United States in Nashville, Tennessee.

Winners
2008 Rough Draft
2000 Foolish Things
1994  Terri Bocklund - "All Things"
1992 Point of Grace
1992 Janet Hawlik (comedy)
1988 David Phelps (musician)
1980s Babbie Mason

Notable performers and attendees
Numerous national recording artists have performed at, competed at, or attended the event. 

Selected:

 Amy Grant
 Babbie Mason
 BarlowGirl
 Barry McGuire
 Burlap to Cashmere
 CeCe Winans
 Chasing Furies
 Chris Sligh (American Idol finalist)
 Chris Tomlin
 Don Francisco
 First Call
 Jaci Velasquez
 Jars of Clay
 Jordin Sparks (American Idol winner)
 Larnelle Harris
Larry Norman
 Mark Lowry
 Mary Mary
 Matthew West
 Michael W. Smith
 Nichole Nordeman
 Pat Boone
 Pete Carlson
 Point of Grace
 Rachael Lampa
 Rebecca St. James
 Sandi Patty
 Stacie Orrico
 Steven Curtis Chapman
 Steve Taylor
 Switchfoot
 The Imperials
 The Waiting
 Bryan Duncan
 Whiteheart
 Oliver North (unannounced "wave" to attendees on stage 1989/1990)
 Brennan Manning
 Sheila Walsh (singer)
 Walt Mills
 Darlene Koldenhoven

References

External links
Immerse Web site link, Retrieved June 30, 2011.
Gospel Music Association (GMA) Web site link, Retrieved June 30, 2011.
Advertisement for 2007 contest

Estes Park, Colorado
Christianity in Colorado
Music festivals in Colorado
Defunct organizations based in Colorado
1975 establishments in Colorado
Christian music festivals
Defunct music festivals
Music festivals established in 1975